This is a list of Buddhist temples, monasteries, stupas, and pagodas in South Korea' for which there are Wikipedia articles, sorted by location.

Daejeon
 Musangsa

Gyeonggi
 Bongseonsa
 Silleuksa
 Yongjusa

Gangwon

 Naksansa
 Oseam
 Sinheungsa
 Woljeongsa

North Chungcheong
 Beopjusa
 Guinsa

South Chungcheong
 Magoksa
 Sudeoksa

North Gyeongsang
 Bulguksa (including Seokguram)
 Bunhwangsa
 Donghwasa
 Hwangnyongsa
 Jikjisa

South Gyeongsang

 Beomeosa
 Busan
 Haeinsa (one of the Three Jewel Temples)
 Ssanggyesa
 Tongdosa (one of the Three Jewel Temples)

North Jeolla
 Geumsansa
 Miruk-sa
 Seonunsa

South Jeolla
 Hwaeomsa
 Songgwangsa (one of the Three Jewel Temples)

North Pyeongan
 Pohyonsa

Seoul

 Bongeunsa
 Bongwonsa
 Jogyesa

See also
 Buddhism in South Korea
 Korean Buddhist sculpture
 Korean Buddhist temples
 Korean pagoda
 List of Buddhist temples
 Tripitaka Koreana
 Temple Stay

External links

 BuddhaNet's Comprehensive Directory of Buddhist Temples sorted by country
 Buddhactivity Dharma Centres database

 
South Korea
South Korea
Buddhist temples